In arithmetic, quotition and partition are two ways of viewing fractions and division.

In quotition division one asks, "how many parts are there?"; While in partition division one asks, "what is the size of each part?".

For example, the expression is

 

and it can be constructed of either two ways:

 "How many parts of the size of 2 must be added to get the amount of 6?" (Quotition division)
 One can write
 
 Since it takes 3 parts, the conclusion is that
 
 "What is the size of 2 equal parts whose sum is that of 6?".  (Partition division)
 One can write
 
 Since the size of each part is 3, the conclusion is that
 

It is a fact of elementary theoretical mathematics that the numerical answer is always the same no matter which way you put it,  6 ÷ 2 = 3.  This is essentially equivalent to the commutativity of multiplication in multiplication arithmetic.

Division involves thinking about a whole in terms of its parts. One frequent division notation, is that a natural number of equal parts, is known as a partition to educators who teach it.
The basic concept behind a partition is sharing. In sharing instead the whole entity becomes an integer number with equal parts.
What quotition focuses on, is explained by removing the word integer in the last sentence. Allow the number to be any fraction and you may have a quotition instead of a partition.

See also
 List of partition topics

References

External links

 A University of Melbourne web page shows what to do when the fraction is a ratio of integers or rational.

Operations on numbers